Tješilo is a village in the municipality of Fojnica, Bosnia and Herzegovina. It is the birthplace of the Bosnian Franciscan friar and bishop Pavao Dragičević (1694-1773).

Demographics 
According to the 2013 census, its population was 444.

References

Populated places in Fojnica